Asunción Sánchez Abellán (born March 21, 1955), known as Susi Sánchez, is a Spanish theater, film, and television actress.

Career
Susi Sánchez is best known for her roles in the Vicente Aranda film Mad Love, where she gives life to Queen Isabella I, and in the plays  and Mujeres soñaron caballos. For these three roles she was nominated for the Spanish Actors and Actresses Union Awards, winning as Best Supporting Actress for her performance in Cara de plata.

In 2015 she joined the cast of the TV series Carlos, rey emperador, playing Louise of Savoy.

Personal life
Susi Sánchez was the long-time romantic partner of actress and acting coach Consuelo Trujillo. The two attended numerous Gay Pride events and spoken out in favor of LGBT rights. Her niece Ruth Gabriel (daughter of actor Ismael Abellán, Susi Sánchez's elder brother) is also an actress.

Theater

Filmography

Films

TV series

TV movies

Accolades

References

External links

 

1955 births
20th-century Spanish actresses
21st-century Spanish actresses
Spanish lesbian actresses
Living people
People from Valencia
Spanish film actresses
Spanish stage actresses
Spanish television actresses
Spanish LGBT rights activists
Actresses from the Valencian Community